Jean-Michel Cels (1819 – 1894) was a Belgian landscape painter.

He was born in the Hague as the son of the painter Cornelis Cels, who taught him to paint. He was the brother of the architect Josse Cels.

References 

 

1819 births
1894 deaths
Artists from The Hague
19th-century Belgian painters
19th-century Belgian male artists